Susan Lynne Wagner (born 1961) is an American financial executive. Wagner is one of the co-founders of BlackRock, an American multinational investment management corporation, and served there in the capacities of vice chairman and chief operating officer. BlackRock is the largest asset management firm in the world with $8.67 trillion in assets under management as of May 2021.

In 2011, she was named to two lists of powerful women: "Most Powerful Women in New York 2011" and "50 Most Powerful Women in Business (2011)".

Early life and education
Wagner was born in 1961 in Chicago to a Jewish family. She graduated in 1982 with honors from Wellesley College with a BA in English and economics, and then earned an MBA in finance from the University of Chicago in 1984.

Career
After earning her MBA, Wagner joined Lehman Brothers' investment banking unit in New York City. During her years at Lehman she worked on mergers and acquisitions, fixed income products, and strategic acquisitions. In 1988, Wagner and Ralph Schlosstein left Lehman to join Blackstone Financial Group. Later, Blackstone Financial Group changed their name to BlackRock.

As one of the founders of BlackRock, Wagner served as vice chairman and chief operating officer. She orchestrated BlackRock's mergers and acquisitions, which included Quellos, Merrill Lynch Investment Management, and Barclays Global Investors. Prior to retiring from BlackRock in 2012, Wagner expanded the company into Asia, the Middle East and Brazil. Since retiring from BlackRock, she serves on the BlackRock board of directors as well as serving as an officer and member of the board of trustees of the Hackley School.     
   
In May 2014, Wagner was asked by Wellesley's class of 2014 to deliver the commencement address.

In July 2014, Wagner was named to the board of Apple Inc., replacing long-time board member William Campbell. Wagner was the second woman on the Apple eight-member board and the only director with a background in finance. In 2014, she also was elected to the board of directors of Swiss Re.

References

Wellesley College alumni
University of Chicago Booth School of Business alumni
American women business executives
American business executives
Jewish American bankers
Living people
Place of birth missing (living people)
1961 births
Directors of Apple Inc.
21st-century American women